"Kings of the Wild Frontier" was the first 7" single by Adam and the Ants to feature the two-drummer Burundi beat for which the band became famous. It was also the first written by Adam Ant & Marco Pirroni, and their first single on CBS Records after leaving Do It Records.

Originally released on 25 July 1980, it peaked at number 48 on the UK Singles Chart. Following the breakthrough success of "Dog Eat Dog" and 'Antmusic' (numbers 4 and 2, respectively), "Kings of the Wild Frontier" was re-released in February 1981. This time it reached number 2.

"The extent of its success surprised us," Pirroni recalled. "We'd written the music as a soundtrack to the visuals – very Eighties. I took that cowboy guitar twang from Ennio Morricone's The Good, The Bad and The Ugly soundtrack. I was trying to get everything I liked into that record. And it worked."

Adam's ever-changing line-up of Ants included, on this song, Pirroni on guitar, Kevin Mooney on bass guitar and, on drums, both Chris Hughes (under the pseudonym "Merrick") and Terry Lee Miall.

It was included on the album of the same name released 3 November 1980. The B-side, "Press Darlings," was not. When the album was released in the US, the track "Making History" was dropped in favour of "Press Darlings" and "Physical (You're So)."

Reception 
The Guardian said the song was "one of history's flat-out weirdest bids for screamy teen stardom: the lyrics beckon new fans in – "a wild nobility, we are the family" – set to a cacophony of thunderous drums, shouting, whooping, feedback and Duane Eddy-style guitar. It is unbelievably exciting."

References

External links

1980 singles
Adam and the Ants songs
Songs written by Adam Ant
1980 songs
Song recordings produced by Chris Hughes (record producer)
Songs written by Marco Pirroni
CBS Records singles